Outremont High School was a high school in the Montreal suburb of Outremont, operated by the Protestant School Board of Greater Montreal. The school was located at 500 Boulevard Dollard and opened in 1955. The building is now an adult education centre.

Alumni
Irwin Cotler, law professor and Member of Parliament
Lawrence Bergman, member of the National Assembly of Quebec and philanthropist
Elias Koteas, actor
Millicent Redway, businessperson and multicultural marketing pioneer

References

 

High schools in Montreal
Educational institutions established in 1956
Outremont, Quebec
1956 establishments in Canada